The 1976 Cupa României Final was the 38th final of Romania's most prestigious football cup competition. It was disputed between Steaua București and CSU Galaţi, and was won by Steaua București after a game with only one goal. It was the 12th cup for Steaua București.

CSU Galaţi became the 11th team representing Divizia B that reached the Romanian Cup final.

Match details

See also
List of Cupa României finals

References

External links
Romaniansoccer.ro

1976
Cupa
Romania
FC Steaua București matches